Christopher Lamb (born 6 September 1990 in Southport, Queensland) is an Australian baseball pitcher who is a free agent. He pitched for the Brisbane Bandits from 2010 to 2012.

Career
Chris played for the Gulf Coast Orioles in 2010 and 2011, compiling an 8.10 ERA, before being released. He debuted for the Bandits on 7 January 2011 against the Canberra Cavalry, getting Donald Lutz to ground out for a hold. Lamb would not pitch again until the next season.

References

External links
, or ABL

1990 births
Living people
Australian expatriate baseball players in the United States
Baseball pitchers
Brisbane Bandits players
Gulf Coast Orioles players
Sportspeople from the Gold Coast, Queensland